The Kasta 2E (NATO: Flat Face E, alternative name Casta 2E) is a modern Russian radar system.

The development of the Kasta 2E surveillance radars was initiated in the former Soviet Union. Its primary objective is to overcome deficiencies or to satisfy the demand in low-level surveillance.

The Kasta 2E1 (51U6) system uses two antennas and consists of two vehicles:
 one truck carries the antenna and its peripheral equipment
 another truck operates as command post vehicle and on a trailer unit, the external power supply is installed

The Kasta 2E2 (39N6E) system uses one antenna and consists of three vehicles:
 one truck carries the antenna and its peripheral equipment
 another truck operates as command post vehicle
 a diesel-electric power plant is mounted another truck and two single-axle trailers carry auxiliary equipment

Both radar types can be triggered with either equal or opposed phases. Both antenna types can optionally be mounted on a standard 50 m pylon. This arrangement causes a displacement of the radar horizon which in turn increases the detection altitude up to 6 km at a distance of 150 km.

References 
 «КАСТА-2Е1»(51У6) - Company website from ОАО Муромский завод радиоизмерительных приборов
 «КАСТА-2Е2» (39Н6Е) - Company website from ОАО Муромский завод радиоизмерительных приборов
  Rosoboron company website

Russian and Soviet military radars
Military equipment of Greece